Dinamo 1948, commonly known as Dinamo București or simply Dinamo, is a Romanian professional football club based in Bucharest, which competes in the Liga II.

Founded in 1948, it has spent almost its entire history in the Liga I, the top tier of the Romanian league system. Domestically, Dinamo București is one of the two most successful teams in the country, having won 18 Liga I titles, 13 Cupa României, two Supercupa României, and one Cupa Ligii. In the 1983–84 season, it became the first club in Romania to reach the semi-finals of the European Cup.

Dinamo București's traditional home colours are white and red, while the current crest is a modified version of the one adopted in the 1998. Their home venue is the namesake Stadionul Dinamo, although significant matches have also been played at Arena Națională. Their bitter rivals are neighbouring FC Steaua București, with the matches between the two being commonly referred to as "the Eternal Derby".

History

Dinamo București was founded on 14 May 1948, when Unirea Tricolor MAI, newly entered in January 1948 under the umbrella of the Communist regime's Internal Affairs Ministry, merged with Ciocanul București. The people who contributed at the foundation of the club were the Minister of Internal Affairs, Teohari Georgescu and the Jewish brothers Alexandru and Turi Vogl. The sporting club represented the above-mentioned institution. The "Dinamo" name was used for the first time on 1 May 1948. Nevertheless, the real debut of Dinamo was in the 1947–48 Divizia A edition, finishing eighth. The squad included Ambru, Angelo Niculescu, Teodorescu, Șiclovan, Bartha, and Sârbu. In 1955, Dinamo achieved its inaugural league championship. With Angelo Niculescu as head coach, Dinamo had a strong offensive power, with an attack formed by Ene I, Neagu and Suru. The defense, with players like Băcuț I, Băcuț II, Szökő, Călinoiu, was the best in the championship, with only 19 goals conceded.

In the fall of 1956, the team achieved Romania's inaugural presence in European competition in the European Champion Clubs' Cup, created in 1955. On 26 August 1956, with 32,000 spectators, Dinamo defeated Galatasaray, 3–1. In the second leg, Dinamo would lose in Istanbul 1–2. Other teams Dinamo would compete in Europe, were Real Madrid (a team with Di Stefano and Gento – the game played in Bucharest took place at 23 August Stadium, and established a new record for this arena: 100,000 spectators), Inter Milan and Feyenoord: 0–3 and 0–2. In 1973, Dinamo won a European Cup home match against Northern Ireland's Crusaders Belfast with 11–0. The game continues to be the largest margin of victory in the history of the European Cup.

The autumn of 1983–84 was going to represent a valuable step into the international arena. The "European Champions Cup campaign" started with Finnish team Kuusysi Lahti, which they defeated 1–0 and 3–0. The second round pushed Dinamo against the current champion, Hamburger SV – team of Stein, Kalz and Magath. At Bucharest, Augustin, Mulțescu and Orac scored for 3–0. The thrilling second leg finished 3–2, with goals from Țălnar and Mulțescu). In order to accede to the semi-finals of CCE, Dinamo had to defeat another top team—Dinamo Minsk. The first leg was 1–1, Rednic equalizing in the 87th minute, and it was followed by a 1–0 victory at Bucharest with Augustin scoring. Dinamo was the first Romanian team to reach the European Champions Cup semi-finals, where it met Liverpool. Dinamo lost 1–0 at Anfield and 2–1 in Bucharest, as Liverpool progressed to the 1984 European Cup Final. In 1986 Dinamo won the Cup against Steaua, the team that only a few days before won the European Cup final.

In the summer of 1990, Dinamo—with Mircea Lucescu as coach, they conquered a new national title, its thirteenth. Also the team won the Cup final 6–4, against Steaua. Dinamo won the league title in 1992, 2000, 2002, 2004, and 2007, but failed to reach the final phases of European competitions during those years.

In 2013, the team changed ownership, as businessman Ionuț Negoiță bought the club. Instead, the club was declared insolvent and started a period of poor results. Even after the club got out of insolvency, the results didn't improve and Dinamo failed to qualify for the Liga I championship play-off for four seasons in a row (2017–18 through to 2020–21). In August 2020, Negoiță sold the club to a Spanish company, Benel International SA, represented by Pablo Cortacero. On 26 June 2021, the club filled for insolvency for the second time in its history.

On 29 May 2022, Dinamo was relegated for the first time in their 74-year history to the Liga II, having lost in the relegation play-off against Universitatea Cluj with 3–1 on aggregate.

Crest and colours

Dinamo's colours are red and white. The current crest includes the profile of two red dogs and also a gold star above them, representing the club's tenth league title.

Stadium

Dinamo plays its home games at Stadionul Dinamo. The arena was built in 1951, and for the official inauguration Dinamo played a game against Locomotiva Timișoara. The stadium capacity was planned at 16,000, but the installation of seats decreased it to 15,032. The stadium is part of a larger complex which contains a smaller stadium, Stadionul Florea Dumitrache, where the second team, Dinamo II, would play its matches. It is currently used by CS Dinamo București rugby team. There is also a sports hall and a swimming pool.

The stadium is referred to as "Groapa" (The Pit), as it was dug rather than raising stands. The North stand is honors Peluza Cătălin Hîldan, a former Dinamo player who died in 2000 at the age of 24.

Dinamo plays significant matches, such as against rivals FCSB, at Arena Națională.

Support

Dinamo has an estimated 13% support in Romania, making them the second most supported Romanian club, after FCSB. The largest concentration of fans is in Bucharest, mainly in the northeast and central areas of the city. The club also has important fan bases on other parts of the country and where significant bases of Romanians are found.

The roots of the Dinamo ultras (fans) movement can be found in 1995 when groups like Dracula and Rams Pantelimon appeared in the North End. In 1996 a group called Nuova Guardia was formed, and became the leading group in the stadium and later on in the entire Romanian ultras movement. Following the death of the former captain, Cătălin Hîldan, in 2000, the fans renamed the North End of Dinamo's stadium to Peluza Catalin Hîldan (PCH Stand) in his honor. The majority of supporters are located in the PCH, but several factions have moved to the South End.

Rivalries & Friendships

Dinamo's significant rivalry is with FCSB, with matches between them dubbed the Eternal derby. Both clubs have had the most popularity in Romania with as strong reactions from its respective fans in clashes in the stadium during games and elsewhere. In 1997, Dinamo's fans set a sector of the Stadionul Ghencea on fire. On 16 August 2016, during FCSB's UEFA Champions League 0–5 play-off loss against Manchester City, Dinamo fans unveiled a banner that read Doar Dinamo București ("Only Dinamo Bucharest").

The club's second most important rivalry is against Rapid București. In the 1990s, there was fierce competition between the two in winning the championship title.

Another rivalry is held against Universitatea Craiova; both finished with the same number of points in the 1972–73 Divizia A, but Dinamo was given the title because of their superior goal difference. A conflict has existed ever since. Other smaller rivalries exist, such as the one against Petrolul Ploiești.

Dinamo's fans have a good friendship with Universitatea Cluj's fans. The friendship started in the mid-1990s, both ultras groups being linked with "the mentality, fanaticism and nationalist side" and the common hate for FCSB. Dinamo have unofficial friendship with Crvena zvezda, famous Serbian club. Friendship between this two clubs, are based on Orthodox Christianity same religion.

Youth program

Dinamo has an important infrastructure for training professionalism in the sport and developing interest in the youth area. The youth center organises a system based on nine age groups between nine and 18 years. Dinamo has around 180 juniors.

All the groups play in the competitions organised by the Bucharest Football Association and in those created by the Romanian Federation. Youths around 16–18 years old are promoted to the second team, Dinamo II.

The youth center has its base in the Dinamo Sports Center, where they have eight dressing rooms for the players, one for the coaches, one for the referees, a medical center and a store room for the equipment. Also, the center has many training grounds, among them the Piți Varga field.

Honours

Domestic

Leagues
Liga I
Winners (18): 1955, 1961–62, 1962–63, 1963–64, 1964–65, 1970–71, 1972–73, 1974–75, 1976–77, 1981–82, 1982–83, 1983–84, 1989–90, 1991–92, 1999–2000, 2001–02, 2003–04, 2006–07
Runners-up (20): 1951, 1952, 1953, 1956, 1958–59, 1960–61, 1966–67, 1968–69, 1973–74, 1975–76, 1978–79, 1980–81, 1984–85, 1986–87, 1987–88, 1988–89, 1992–93, 1998–99, 2000–01, 2004–05

Cups
Cupa României
Winners (13): 1958–59, 1963–64, 1967–68, 1981–82, 1983–84, 1985–86, 1989–90, 1999–2000, 2000–01, 2002–03, 2003–04, 2004–05, 2011–12
Runners-up (10): 1954, 1968–69, 1969–70, 1970–71, 1986–87, 1987–88, 1988–89, 2001–02, 2010–11, 2015–16
Cupa Ligii
Winners (1): 2016–17
Supercupa României
Winners (2): 2005, 2012
Runners-up (4): 2001, 2002, 2003, 2007

Continental
European Cup
Semi-finalists (1): 1983–84
Cup Winners' Cup
Semi-finalists (1): 1989–90

Players

First-team squad

Out on loan

Retired numbers

Club officials

Board of directors

 Last updated: 13 March 2023
 Source: Board of directors

Current technical staff

 Last updated: 13 March 2023
 Source: Technical staff

Statistics and records

European cups all-time statistics 

Updated 3 August 2017.

Records in the league:
 Consecutive winning games: 17 games (12 June 1988 – 27 November 1988)
 Best unbeaten run: 47 games (26 May 1991 – 20 September 1992)
 Player with most appearances:  Cornel Dinu (454)
 Top scorer:  Dudu Georgescu (207)
 Player with most appearances in international games:  Claudiu Niculescu (43)
 Top scorer in international games:  Claudiu Niculescu (18)
Records in the European competition:

 Biggest home win: Dinamo 11–0  Crusaders F.C. (1973–74) (still the biggest margin of victory in the history of the European Cup)
 Biggest away win:  Alki Larnaca F.C. 0–9 Dinamo (1979–80)
 Heaviest home defeat: Dinamo 0–3  Feyenoord (1971–72), Dinamo 0–3  Galatasaray (2009–10)
 Heaviest away defeat:  PFC CSKA Sofia 8–1 Dinamo (1956–57)

Notable former players

Dinamo's record appearance-maker is Cornel Dinu, who made 454 appearances between 1966 and 1983. Ionel Dănciulescu has made the second most appearances with 355.

Notable former coaches

Nicolae Dumitru is the most successful head coach in Dinamo's history, with five league titles and two Romanian Cups. Ioan Andone won five trophies for Dinamo, winning one title in Liga I, three Romanian Cups and one Supercup.

Notes

References
Notes

Citations

Further reading

External links
 

Club profile on UEFA's official website
Club profile on LPF's official website —   

 
Association football clubs established in 1948
1948 establishments in Romania
Football clubs in Bucharest
Liga I clubs
Liga II clubs